Lee Everett is one of the protagonists of Telltale's The Walking Dead video game series, debuting as the playable main protagonist of the first season. Tasked with protecting a girl named Clementine in the midst of a zombie apocalypse, Lee allies with several other characters and groups. When creating Lee, the developers attempted to achieve realism, with a strong emphasis on him being a parental figure to Clementine. He is voiced by Dave Fennoy, an American voice actor. He received a positive reception for his role in the game, specifically the voice work and the writing. Fennoy was nominated for Best Performance by a Human Male at the Spike VGA.

Appearances
Prior to the events of the game, Lee, a native of Macon, was a history professor at the University of Georgia. One day, on his way to work, he fell ill and came home to find his wife sleeping with another man, a state senator, after constant fighting with his wife about travelling often for her job. In a fit of rage, Lee unintentionally killed him. He was subsequently tried and convicted for murder. His crime also distanced him from his parents and brother. Lee was sentenced to life imprisonment for the senator's murder, and was ordered to be sent to Meriwether County Correctional Facility to start serving his life sentence.

The onset of the zombie apocalypse occurs as Lee is being taken to prison to begin serving his life sentence. While Lee was having a conversation with the police officer escorting him to prison, the police car transporting him to prison crashes into a zombie, and he manages to escape after killing the officer who attacked him after being zombified, but he quickly realizes the dire situation he is in. He takes shelter in a nearby suburban home, where he finds young Clementine who has been hiding from the zombies as her parents had left for Savannah some time before the apocalypse. Recognizing that Clementine would remain in danger, he offers to take and protect her, hoping that they will be able to find her parents. He eventually goes with her to the Hershel Greene farm, where they meet a fisherman named Kenny, his wife, Katjaa, and son, Duck. After an accident with walkers claims the life of Hershel's son, Shawn, the five are thrown out and eventually meet with other survivors, and form a small group, though Lee remains subdued about his history. After discovering the fate of his own family in Macon, Lee takes on more of a role of a father figure to Clementine.

After having holed up in a motel for three months with dwindling supplies, the group meets the St. John family, who invite them to dinner at their family dairy. The group agrees to send out a delegation to the St. Johns' farmstead to see if they are trustworthy; however, Lee discovers that the St. Johns have engaged in cannibalism and that they plan to kill and eat his group as well. After surviving the St. Johns, the group is forced to flee the motel from bandits and head to Savannah via a train. En route, Lee starts to help Clementine learn survival skills such as how to use a gun and why she needs to keep her hair short. As they approach the city, Clementine's walkie-talkie goes off, revealing the voice of a man who knows of Lee's actions to this point and promises Clementine that she will be safe with him.

In Savannah, the survivors look for a boat and supplies to flee the mainland. They encounter more survivors, including a doctor called Vernon and a young woman called Molly. With their help, they are able to prepare the boat for their journey. Vernon departs, but remarks that he believes Lee to be an unsuitable guardian for Clementine. The next morning, Lee wakes to find Clementine gone, and while searching for her, he is surprised by a zombie and bitten. With what little time he has, Lee and the other survivors agree to look for Clementine, at first believing her to have been taken by Vernon. Instead, the man on the walkie-talkie reveals that he has kidnapped Clementine, and is at the hotel that her parents would have been at. After entering the now abandoned safehouse of Vernon's group, Lee is given the option of amputating his bitten arm. Either way, Lee and the group are able to escape from the hospital where they make their way back to the house, but find that the boat has been stolen by Vernon and his group. Shortly after the house is overrun with walkers but the group escape into the attic, where they eventually find a way out. Casualties arise while making their way to the hotel, and Lee is separated from Omid and Christa. Barely hanging onto consciousness, Lee makes it to the hotel and meets Clementine's captor, who explains that Lee's group had previously stolen provisions from his family's car, which ultimately led to the death of his wife and children, and goes to question Lee's other decisions and, regardless of whether or not he had joined in taking the provisions from the car, ultimately berates him and plans to kill him and look after Clementine as his own. Lee gets Clementine's help to subdue and kill the man. They make it out of the hotel by covering themselves in walker guts where they discover Clementine's zombified parents before Lee passes out.

When Lee awakens, he is out of strength and barely able to keep conscious, but finds Clementine has dragged him to safety. With his time short, Lee helps Clementine secure keys and a gun to escape the city, and tells her to find Omid and Christa. The player can choose to have Lee instruct Clementine to either shoot him to prevent his reanimation or do nothing and leave him to become a walker (a choice left to the player).

Lee appears in a dream that Clementine has after falling unconscious from being shot during the events of the final episode of Season Two. The dream flashbacks to the time the group has fled the motel after Lilly killed Carley/Doug, and Clementine recalls the advice that Lee gave her about learning to survive and cope in this new reality, considerations that she has to keep in mind once she regains consciousness when faced with Kenny and Jane's growing feud. 

Lee appears in another dream during the events of the third episode of The Final Season, with Clementine dreaming of their time on the train to Savannah. Lee helps Clementine gain the confidence she needs to lead an attack on a group of raiders, led by Lilly, to rescue her friends.

Lee appears later again in Clementine where Clementine has a nightmare about him carrying her through a herd of walkers, but he ends up dropping her, causing Clementine to wake up. He later appears in two flashbacks during his first met with Clementine and the time where Clementine ask her to shoot him.

Concept and creation
Lee first appeared in the 2012 episodic video game The Walking Dead as the playable character. He is voiced by Dave Fennoy, and was written by multiple people, including Gary Whitta in the fourth episode. Fennoy received an audition in an email, and after completing it, he received a call confirming that he got the role. The audition asked for actors to portray him in a "very real" fashion, which is a part of Lee's design that attracted Fennoy. He called Lee "complicated", due to his criminal history, his concern for keeping Clementine safe, and the fact that he associates with people that he may not have had it not been for the zombie outbreak. He added that him having a child of his own helped him relate to Lee and Clementine's relationship. Whitta described their relationship as "emotionally authentic". Dan Connors, CEO of Telltale Games, compared Lee to Rick Grimes, the protagonist of The Walking Dead comics and TV series. He called him both tough and smart, while also caring. He also called him a "reflection of the player's choices". Telltale designer and writer Harrison G. Pink commented that it was important to make everything Lee would say believable, and that Lee is a "human being" with "real needs and real fears and real desires". While they wanted to allow players to choose what Lee says, all options are things that Lee would realistically say. Lead writer Sean Vanaman said that they also wanted to contextualize issues about race within the game; they spent time to write the backstory of events that Lee had faced from racism that led to the confrontation with his wife, and worked to make Lee and other characters' dialog reflect on Lee's experiences rather than including simply stereotypical representations of racial conflict.

In October 2021, It was revealed that Lee will make an appearance in upcoming graphic novel Clementine by Tillie Walden.

Reception
Lee was acclaimed by critics and fans. IGN's Colin Campbell wrote an article detailing why Lee "really matters". He explains that the reason why the game is so good is because Lee has a lot of great qualities, such as being nice and modest about his abilities. He goes on to describe him as an "everyman". Fellow IGN writer Greg Miller also cited Lee for why he enjoys the game; he wrote that he felt he was actually involved in Lee's development. Polygon included him and Clementine as one of the 70 best video game characters of the 2010s with the publication's Colin Campbell writing, "Lee is an escaped convict in the midst of a zombie outbreak who finds himself caring for a frightened, vulnerable girl called Clementine. Later seasons show Clementine’s debt to Lee, and the lessons she learned from her redoubtable mentor. These are characters who are genuinely loved by their many fans." Kotaku's Kirk Hamilton writes that he is more interested in seeing Lee grow than Rick Grimes, the protagonist of The Walking Dead comics and TV series. Rock Paper Shotgun's John Walker wrote that Lee was an everyman character in zombie fiction. Samuel James Riley of GamesRadar listed Lee alongside Clementine as one of the best video game duos, and further stated that the characters' story is touching and ultimately one of the most tragic friendships in gaming history. The Daily Telegraphs Emily Richardson felt that the characters drove the story, and cited Lee and his "mysterious and complex" character design as a notable example. GamesRadar staff named Lee the 84th-best video game hero. They cited his bravery and devotion to Clementine for his inclusion. Dave Fennoy received praise for his portrayal of Lee, such as by Alan Danzis of the New York Post. Fennoy was nominated for the "Best Performance by a Human Male" award at the 2012 Spike TV Video Game Awards, and for the "Performance" category at the 2013 British Academy Video Games Awards. Lee's character won the "Outstanding Character Performance" at the 2013 D.I.C.E. Summit.

Notes

References 

Adventure game characters
Amputee characters in video games
Black characters in video games
Fictional criminals in video games
Fictional African-American people
Fictional American people in video games
Fictional characters from Georgia (U.S. state)
Fictional murderers
Fictional professors
Fictional zombie hunters
Horror video game characters
Male characters in video games
The Walking Dead video games
The Walking Dead (franchise) characters
Video game characters introduced in 2012
Video game protagonists
Zombie and revenant characters in video games